Headingley is a suburb of Leeds, West Yorkshire, England, approximately two miles out of the city centre, to the north west along the A660 road. Headingley is the location of the Beckett Park campus of Leeds Beckett University and Headingley Stadium.

The vast majority of the area sits in the Headingley and Hyde Park ward of Leeds City Council and Leeds North West parliamentary constituency.

History

Headingley was mentioned in the Domesday Book in 1086 as Hedingelei or Hedingeleia when it was recorded that Ilbert de Lacy held 7 carucates (about 840 acres) of land. The name is thought to derive from Old English Head(d)inga 'of the descendants of Head(d)a' + lēah 'open ground', thus meaning "the clearing of Hedda's people". Headda has sometimes been identified with Saint Hædde. A stone coffin found near Beckett Park in 1995 suggests there may have been an earlier settlement in late Roman or post-Roman times.

From Viking times, Headingley was the centre of the Skyrack wapentake or Siaraches, the "Shire oak". The name may refer to an oak tree that was a meeting place for settling legal disputes and raising armies. An ancient oak, said to be the Shire Oak, stood to the north of St Michael's Church until 1941, and gives its name to two public houses, the Original Oak and the Skyrack.

During the 13th century William de Poiteven gave land in Headingley to Kirkstall Abbey, and in 1341 the remainder of the township of Headingley-cum-Burley was given to the monastery by the owner, John de Calverley.

A map of 1711 shows Headingley as having a chapel, cottages and farmsteads scattered around a triangle of land formed by the merging of routes from north, west and south. Enclosed fields were situated around the settlement with a large tract of common land, Headingley Moor, to the north. In an 1801 census, Headingley's population was given as 300.

An 1829 Act of Parliament enclosed Headingley Moor and the land was placed for sale. Around 30 workers' cottages encroached on the fringes of the moor before 1829. Land here was generally cheaper than that at Headingley Hill as it failed to attract the building of affluent villas. This brought about the building of smaller terraced housing around Moor Road and Cottage Road. In the mid 19th century, Far Headingley had begun to develop over what was largely unclaimed common land.

Headingley was a village until the expansion of Leeds during the Industrial Revolution and became a popular suburb where the rich moved to escape the filth and pollution of the city.

In 1840, Leeds Zoological and Botanical Gardens opened but despite the opening of the nearby Headingley railway station in 1849, the zoo was loss-making and closed in 1858. The bear pit survives on Cardigan Road.

Meanwood Beck, to the east of the village, was a source of water for the early inhabitants and later provided a source of power for the Victorians of Leeds.

The Leeds Tramway terminated at a depot at Far Headingley between 1875 and 1959. The trams improved the accessibility of Headingley from Leeds city centre, which facilitated growth and attracted affluent middle class inhabitants. The tramway perhaps ended Headingley's village status and made it into a suburb.

With exception of Beckett Park and the surrounding area, most of Headingley had been developed by the beginning of the 20th century. In the 1911 census the population of Headingley was in excess of 46,000.

Leeds Beckett University (formerly Leeds Metropolitan University) has a campus at Beckett Park in Headingley.  Much of the housing around Kirkstall Lane is rented to students. The conversion of Leeds Polytechnic into a university and its subsequent growth brought about an increased student population.

Headingley Stadium hosts England test matches and rugby league matches bringing many spectators to the area. The cricket ground has been enlarged to maintain its eligibility for test matches and in 2006 the eastern terraces on the rugby ground were replaced with the Carnegie stand. The winter shed cricket pavilion has been replaced with a new stand and media centre.

Sports

Professional
Headingley is also known in sporting circles; its stadium is known as Headingley – earlier  spelt Headingly.  The stadium is home to the Yorkshire County Cricket Club as well as the Leeds Rhinos rugby league and Yorkshire Carnegie rugby union clubs.

For many decades the stadium remained largely unchanged. Since 2000, however, the cricket ground has been nearly entirely rebuilt in order to retain Test match status.  The winter shed was demolished in 2008 and replaced by a new stand and media centre, giving the approach to the north entrance a distinctive and modern waymark.  The rugby ground also saw development with the building of the Carnegie Stand which replaced the former Eastern Terraces.  This was built with co-operation from  Leeds Beckett University who retain lecture rooms in the building.

Amateur
Headingley also boasts an amateur association football team, Headingley AFC. The club nearly folded after losing its home ground, however in 2008, the club was offered a new ground by the University of Bradford, before moving to Weetwood Playing Fields, owned by the University of Leeds. They attracted media attention in January 2019 for featuring a shirt sponsor warning of the dangers of gambling. There is also two amateur cricket clubs (Headingley Bramhope CC & St. Chads CC) in Far Headingley.

Politics
Politically, almost all of Headingley is in the Leeds North West constituency. The current Member of Parliament (MP) is Alex Sobel (Labour Party) who succeeded Greg Mulholland (Liberal Democrat) in the 2017 general election. At a local government level, the ward of Headingley and Hyde Park has three Labour councillors, Al Garthwaite, Jonathan Pryor and Neil Walshaw.

A small part of Headingley, specifically the area around Queenswood Drive, sits in the Kirkstall ward and the Leeds West constituency, where the current MP is Rachel Reeves of Labour.

Amenities

Headingley has two renowned fish and chip shops/fish restaurants which have been operating since the 1930s: Brett's, a 19th-century stone building on North Lane, and The Fisherman's Lodge (formerly Bryan's), a more modern building on Weetwood Lane. There are several pubs and bars plus extensive shopping areas. The pub Headingley Taps is so called because it was formerly a water pumping station. Other pubs and bars include the famous Original Oak, Skyrack, Head of Steam, Arcadia and Manahatta (formerly Arc). Close by in Far Headingley are in close proximity The New Inn, The Three Horseshoes and Woodies. In Headingley Central (formerly the Arndale Centre) there is a Sainsbury's (formerly a Somerfield), a Wilko, a Boots the Chemist and several other chain shops as well as a small multi-storey car park. Headingley also has a small library on North Lane. There are many banks, building societies, restaurants, cafes and charity shops. Along Otley Road there is a large Oxfam bookshop. Until 2005, Headingley had two cinemas, 'The Lounge' and 'The Cottage Road Cinema' (usually referred to as 'Cottage Road'). The Lounge Cinema in the centre of Headingley has since closed and is being redeveloped as office and living accommodation, leaving only Cottage Road in Far Headingley. The area's Woolworths closed in the 1990s. Until the 1980s, the Arndale Centre boasted a bowling alley. The Arndale Centre began undergoing an external facelift in 2009. The nearest large supermarket is a Morrisons in Kirkstall, approximately a mile away from the centre of Headingley. There is a Premier Inn hotel above the Arndale Centre in the tallest building in Headingley, formerly an office block. Headingley is also famous for the Otley Run, which is a pub crawl starting at Woodies Ale House in Far Headingley and finishing at the Dry Dock near Leeds City Centre. Typically the Otley run is done in fancy dress.

People
Many famous writers, past and present, are connected with Headingley: Arthur Ransome, best known perhaps for the children's classic Swallows and Amazons, was born there, J. R. R. Tolkien the writer and author of The Lord of the Rings, lived there when he worked at the university, playwright Alan Bennett once lived over a butcher's shop (now a dry cleaner's) opposite the Three Horseshoes and TV writer Kay Mellor lived in Weetwood. Many writers and poets who currently live in the area participate in the annual Headingley LitFest, which takes place each March, using venues like the Heart Centre, The New Headingley Club, various cafés and private houses. The tenth LitFest took place in 2017. Reviews of all talks and performances are online on the LitFest blog.

In the time of Queen Victoria, Prince Alemayehu of Abyssinia, brought to England after the defeat of his father King Tewedros, died of pneumonia at an address in Hollin Lane, Far Headingley.

Edward Baines, editor of the Leeds Mercury in the 19th century, lived at Headingley Lodge, north of Kirkstall Lane, and  then St  Ann's Hill on St Ann's Lane.

The social reformer, suffragist and writer Isabella Ford was born in Headingley in 1855. 

Yorkshire Ripper Peter Sutcliffe committed two of his 20 attacks in Headingley. He killed 20-year-old Jacqueline Hill – the last of the 13 women he killed – in the area on 17 November 1980. On 24 September that year, he had also attacked Singapore born doctor Upadhya Bandara, 34, in the area, but she survived his assault. Sutcliffe was arrested within two months of Hill's murder and subsequently sentenced to life imprisonment for a total of 13 murders and seven attempted murders.

Headingley Development Trust

HDT is a community benefit society, founded in 2005 by local residents, organisations and small businesses, with the aim of promoting and developing a sustainable, balanced community in Headingley. It is a community business that is self-financing and achieves it aims by delivering, brokering and supporting a range of initiatives that benefit the local community. HDT now has over 1,200 members, making it one of the largest Development Trusts of its kind in the UK.  In 2018 it successfully raised over £480,000 through a community share offer to create the Headingley Investment Fund (HIF) will enable it to further extend its work.

HDT activities currently include:

Headingley Enterprise and Arts Centre (HEART) opened in 2011 in the old Bennett Road primary school building which was completely refurbished and extended.  It is to date Headingley's biggest ever community project. HEART accommodates rehearsal and meeting spaces and training rooms on the ground floor, a café with outdoor and conservatory seating areas and Pulse a 'catalyst’ business centre on the first floor particularly targeted at the arts and media industry. HEART is a true community business which runs without any grant support.

The Headingley Greengrocer became HDT's latest venture when they stepped in to buy the business in April 2019 from RK Harris and Son who were retiring after running it for over 40 years. The site has been a greengrocers shop for over 100 years and a much loved part of the Headingley shopping centre. The Headingley Greengrocer will extend this tradition providing high quality fruit and vegetables and local produce wherever possible and reducing reliance on single use plastics.

Headingley Farmers’ Market has been held every month for over thirteen years on the Rose Garden in the centre of Headingley, providing a community focus as well as where people can buy good quality, food from local Yorkshire producers. There is music at every market and a very popular children's game.

Headingley Homes is an initiative that aims to help balance the Headingley neighbourhood by providing affordable homes for people who want to put down roots here.  It intervenes directly in the housing market, owning property and also leasing it from public-spirited local owners.

Promoting Headingley aims to celebrate Headingley as a desirable place to live, work and explore for current and prospective long-term residents and businesses.

 Headingley Cafe Scientifique meets to hear about and debate ideas in science and technology through talks from local experts. All are welcome and meetings are on the second Monday of each month in the New Headingley Club.

Talking Heads at HEART  is a monthly gathering which aims to stimulate, inform and enliven. Expert speakers introduce and host discussion on topics concerning culture, politics, economics or social issues and often aiming to set a national issue within a local context.  

Films at HEART organises a monthly programme of films, drawing on the best of contemporary, independent feature films and documentaries from European and World cinema. It works with local festivals and film-makers.

The Headingley Community Orchard group finds unused bits of land and plants fruit trees and bushes. It aims to improve the local environment, protect green spaces and help bio-diversity, involve local people and provide learning for new skills.

The Headingley Graffiti Working Group group aims to help residents and businesses tackle illegal tagging and to promote positive alternatives such as supporting the development of street art and murals.

Table Tennis at HEART offers weekly sessions on Monday evenings. Players are aged 9 to 69 of all standards and new players are very welcome.

HDT has also worked with local businesses and helped set up the Natural Food Store on North Lane, now a successful independent co-operative.

Churches

Headingley Parish Church is dedicated to St Michael and All Angels, and is a large, grade II* listed, steepled church on the corner of Otley Road and St Michael's Road, opposite the Skyrack public house. The Church was built between 1884 and 1886 as the third church on this site. There is a separate parish of Far Headingley, with its parish church of St Chad's (also a large steepled church and grade II* listed).

South Parade Baptist church (1908 and 1925, part of Cornerstone Baptist Church since 2020)  and Headingley Methodist Church (1840–45 and later extensions) are both grade II listed. St Columba's United Reformed church is a modern building, as is the Roman Catholic parish church of St Urban's, located to the east of the area. Hinsley Hall in Headingley is the pastoral and conference centre for the Roman Catholic Diocese of Leeds. The small  Lutheran church of St Luke's in Alma Road was converted from the coach house and stable of a Victorian villa.

The Anglican Bishop of Leeds and the Roman Catholic Bishop of Leeds both live within the Headingley area.

Buildings of architectural interest

According to one source "Headingley has the most important group of large and small villas and mansions in the city." and has more than 100 listed buildings. Parts of Headingley are included in Conservation areas established by Leeds City Council.

Individual listed buildings include St Michael's Church and associated buildings, the Hyde Park Picture House, the Elinor Lupton Centre, Moorfield House in Alma Road and the former St Margaret of Antioch church building on Cardigan Road.

Residing  with her at Spring House at this time were her two  sisters-in-law;  Gertrude Middleton (1876–1942),  a former Oxford University student  who  also worked as a VAD nurse  at Gledhow Hall  and  her sister Ellen Middleton (1872-1949)  who  volunteered as "head cook" at Gledhow Hall. A number of premises were named Spring House in and around Leeds, at times operating  as a Home for Friendless Girls in the early decades of the 20th century.

Headingley Castle was built in 1846 and was owned in 1866 by cloth merchant Arthur Lupton (1809–1889) of the Lupton family. It was the home from 1909 to 1943 of entrepreneur and art collector Frank Harris Fulford, and later used to house a school for the blind.

Headingley also has a typical example of a 1960s Arndale Centre. Housing in Headingley is generally Victorian and early 20th century and mostly of little architectural note.

Headingley in media
The ITV television series Fat Friends  was set in Headingley. Large amounts of the eighties ITV Beiderbecke Trilogy was filmed in and around Headingley and Beckett Park, along with Moor Grange and Pudsey. Parts of Headingley stood in for Northern Ireland in Harrys Game, and A Touch of Frost used locations in the area.

Gallery
Images of Headingley

See also
Listed buildings in Leeds (Headingley Ward)
Elmet
Otley Run

References

Further reading

External links

YEP Headingley Today Community Website
Headingley.org community web site maintained by residents.
Headingley Development Trust The HEART project
Headingley LitFest Blog for the annual Headingley LitFest, which takes place in March
Headingley Methodist Church
Headingley Community Website maintained by the council.

 
Student quarters
Leeds Blue Plaques
Places in Leeds